Events in the year 1889 in Portugal.

Incumbents
 Monarch: Charles I (beginning October 19)
 Prime Minister: José Luciano de Castro

Events
 20 October – Portuguese legislative election, 1889

Arts and entertainment

Sports

Births

 28 April – António de Oliveira Salazar, professor and politician (died 1970)
 30 October – Manuel Guerra, sports shooter.
 15 November – Manuel II of Portugal, king (died 1932)

Deaths
 26 September – Infante Augusto, Duke of Coimbra, Royal prince (born 1847)
 19 October – Luís I of Portugal, king (born 1838)

References

 
1880s in Portugal
Portugal
Years of the 19th century in Portugal
Portugal